Clinton Bernard (1929/1930 – 26 October 2019) was a Chief Justice of Trinidad and Tobago from 1985 to 1995. In 2018, he came into public light again after he released his autobiography and openly lamented the poor pension system provided for former high office holders and how it had affected him.

References 

2019 deaths
Year of birth uncertain
Chief justices of Trinidad and Tobago
Place of birth missing
Place of death missing
Autobiographers